Armando Aldegalega (born 23 November 1937) is a Portuguese former long-distance runner. He competed in the marathon at the 1964 Summer Olympics and the 1972 Summer Olympics.

References

External links
 

1937 births
Living people
Athletes (track and field) at the 1964 Summer Olympics
Athletes (track and field) at the 1972 Summer Olympics
Portuguese male long-distance runners
Portuguese male marathon runners
Olympic athletes of Portugal
Sportspeople from Setúbal